The following is a list of schools in Nicaragua.

List
St. Augustine Preparatory School
Barrio Planta Project
Colegio Bautista de Managua
Colegio Centro América
Instituto Loyola
Colegio La Salle, León
Instituto Pedagógico La Salle
Lincoln International Academy
Managua Nicaragua Spanish School
Nicaragua Christian Academy
Nicaragua Spanish Language Schools
 Sol del Sur Spanish School, Rivas
Spanish School Nicaragua

See also
Universities in Nicaragua
Education in Nicaragua

References

Education in Nicaragua
Nicaragua
Schools
Schools
Schools
Nicaragua